merge with Optical granulometry

In mathematical morphology, granulometry is an approach to compute a size distribution of grains in binary images, using a series of morphological opening operations. It was introduced by Georges Matheron in the 1960s, and is the basis for the characterization of the concept of size in mathematical morphology.

Granulometry generated by a structuring element 

,

where  denotes morphological dilation.

,

where  denotes the morphological opening.

The granulometry function  is the cardinality (i.e., area or volume, in continuous Euclidean space, or number of elements, in grids) of the image :

.

.

The parameter k is referred to as size, and the component k of the pattern spectrum  provides a rough estimate for the amount of grains of size k in the image X. Peaks of  indicate relatively large quantities of grains of the corresponding sizes.

Sieving axioms 

The above common method is a particular case of the more general approach derived by Georges Matheron. The French mathematician was inspired by sieving as a means of characterizing size. In sieving, a granular sample is worked through a series of sieves with decreasing hole sizes. As a consequence, the different grains in the sample are separated according to their sizes.

The operation of passing a sample through a sieve of certain hole size "k" can be mathematically described as an operator  that returns the subset of elements in X with sizes that are smaller or equal to k. This family of operators satisfy the following properties:

 Anti-extensivity: Each sieve reduces the amount of grains, i.e.,
 Increasingness: The result of sieving a subset of a sample is a subset of the sieving of that sample, i.e.,
 "Stability": The result of passing through two sieves is determined by the sieve with smallest hole size. I.e., .

A granulometry-generating family of operators should satisfy the above three axioms.

In the above case (granulometry generated by a structuring element), .

Another example of granulometry-generating family is when , where  is a set of linear structuring elements with different directions.

See also 
 Particle-size distribution
 Grain size

References 

 Random Sets and Integral Geometry, by Georges Matheron, Wiley 1975, .
 Image Analysis and Mathematical Morphology by Jean Serra,  (1982)
 Image Segmentation By Local Morphological Granulometries, Dougherty, ER, Kraus, EJ, and Pelz, JB., Geoscience and Remote Sensing Symposium, 1989. IGARSS'89,  (1989)
 An Introduction to Morphological Image Processing by Edward R. Dougherty,  (1992)
 Morphological Image Analysis; Principles and Applications by Pierre Soille,  (1999)

Mathematical morphology